Thunderbird is a 2022 South Korean crime action film directed by  Lee Jae-won, starring Seo Hyun-woo, Lee Myeong-ro, and Lee Seol. It had its world premiere at the 24th Far East Film Festival on April 27, 2022, and was released theatrically on September 21, 2022, in South Korea.

Synopsis
Tae-min calls his elder brother Tae-gyun, a taxi driver asking for help. He wants him to get his car 'Thunderbird' back, which was pawned along with lot of money that he won from gambling. Now Tae-gyun urgently needs money, Tae-min, a gambling addict is deep in a debt, and Mi-young, Tae-min's girlfriend, a former casino dealer, all go out to get the car back. But nothing goes according to their plan. Towards the end of the night, Tae-gyun decides to ditch them and get the money all alone.

Cast
 Seo Hyun-woo as Tae-gyun
 Lee Seol as Mi-young
 Lee Myeong-ro as Tae-min
 Park Seung-tae as Ok-sun 
 Kim Gyu-baek as Jun-mo 
 Choi Euna as In-suk 
 Ahn Il-kwon as Ki-chul

Release

It had its world premiere at the 24th Far East Film Festival on April 27, 2022. It was also selected at 26th Bucheon International Fantastic Film Festival in 'Korean Fantastic: Features', where it won two awards.

It was released theatrically in South Korea on September 21, 2022.

Reception
Pierce Conran reviewing the film for Udine Film Festival in ScreenAnarchy appreciated the performance of Seo Hyun-woo writing, "Seo delivers another strong, edgy and vulnerable performance as Tae-gyun." Conran also praised the deft handling of director Lee, stating, "Lee kept his finger on the pulse of the story, his careful consideration of lighting, and particular attention to the film's soundscape cranked up the tension at all the rights moments." Concluding Conran opined, "Thunderbird is another promising graduation project from KAFA and with any luck director Lee will be afforded a chance in the commercial arena soon." Panos Kotzathanasis writing in HanCinema praised the performances of cast writing, "movie, benefiting the most by the excellent acting of Lee Myeong-ro as Tae-min, Lee Seol as Mi-young, Park Seung-tae as the catalytic pawn-shop owner, but most of all, Seo Hyun-woo as Tae-gyun". Concluding the review Kotzathanasis wrote, "Thunderbird is a very interesting film, particularly rewarding simply because it manages to stray away from the norms of the crime thriller and for Seo Hyun-woo's acting."

Awards and nominations

References

External links
 
 
 
  Thunderbird at BIFAN

2022 films
2020s Korean-language films
South Korean crime action films